Genervie Kam Shi Ling (born 24 May 1980), known professionally as Genervie Kam, is a Malaysian violinist, pianist, music director and arranger. Kam began her studies after she turned three years old, when she received her first piano lesson from Yamaha School. With her mother Penny Kam's support, six years later she started studying the violin with her father's friend, Andrew Chye.

In addition to her native Chinese (Cantonese and Hokkien), she is fluent in both English and Malay.

Early education
Kam began her formal piano education at the Yamaha Music School in Petaling Jaya, Selangor, Malaysia and graduated in Junior Special Advanced Course – a special course for gifted children. At the age of twelve, Kam passed the Advanced Certificate Associated Board of the Royal Schools of Music (ABRSM) with distinction. She continues to learn and excel for her Performer's Licentiate Diploma at the Trinity College of Music, London when she was fourteen. Kam enrolled herself at the International College of Music (ICOM) and received her degree in Music in Arranging, which is validated by Westminster University, London. At the same time, she also pursued her Fellowship major in Piano.

Career

Concerts 
Kam toured as a keyboardist, violinist and percussionist and she was the youngest member of the Jacky Cheung Music Odyssey 2002 (World Tour).
This mega concert kicked off in Australia and covered over 50 shows worldwide including Malaysia, Singapore, China, Taiwan, Japan, Brunei, England, US, Canada and ended in Hong Kong. In 2007 and 2008, she also performed for short tours for The Year of Jacky Cheung World Tour 2007 for all shows in Malaysia and Singapore and also for his concert in Bukit Jalil Outdoor Stadium.

She also toured with Singaporean singer- songwriter superstar, Stefanie Sun Yan Zi for her tour within Asia in 2004, 2005, 2006 and short tour 2010 in Beijing.

Performances
Kam already had numerous performances and shows for the live and recorded television shows, corporate events, private shows, product launching for the RTM, TV3, Ntv7, Astro, MediaCorp Singapore, Martell, Bedat & Co., TW Steel, Technomarine, Audemars Piguet, Louis Vuitton, Salvatore Ferragamo, Bernhard Lederer, Mont Blanc, World Savings Banks Institute, BNP Paribas, Citibank, CIMB Bank, Prudential, Acer, Mild Seven, Brabus, Volvo, Lexus, BMW, Mercedes, Munchy's, Amway, Castrol, Petronas and Shell.

Award ceremonies
Kam is a well known versatile musician in the region as she has been active in the industry since 1984 but only started playing amongst other professional musicians for local prestigious award ceremonies such as Anugerah Juara Lagu (AJL), Anugerah Industri Muzik (AIM), Anugerah Radio ERA, Anugerah Bintang Popular (ABP) and Anugerah Skrin (ASK) from 2003 onwards.

Orchestra 
Kam has performed with the (NSO) National Symphony Orchestra. Additionally, she also performed under the baton of conductors such as Takahisa Ota, Mustafa Fuzer Nawi and others.

Instruments
Currently, she plays on a Ted Brewer 5 string Crossbow purchased in 2002. For two years since 2001, she has been using a Fender electric violin given by her youngest brother, Arthur Kam who in 2003 was listed in the Malaysia Book of Records as "The Youngest Person To Complete A Professional Drum Course". Before that, she uses a Gasparo da Salo given by her grand uncle, Kam Kee Chye and is still using it until now.

Awards
Kam has won prizes for her violin and piano playing and also for music arranging.

 2011 – Awarded ICONIC WOMEN by ICON Magazine Malaysia. http://www.bluinc.com.my/iconic-ball/
 2009 – Received the Anugerah Bakat Muda (Penggubah Muzik) by the Ministry of Unity, Culture, Arts and Heritage Malaysia (Anugerah Seni Negara).
 2004 – Received the Founder President's Award for Excellence by Westminster University.
 2003 – Won the Best Student Performer Award, January 2003 at ICOM.
 2002 – Won 1st prize in the Asian Beat Band Competition National Grand Finals and was awarded the Best Keyboardist Award.
 2001 – Took part in 3 categories at the Expo Muzik 2001 and won 2nd prize for piano and 3rd prize for violin in the Overall Classical Section, 1st prize in the Pop Jazz Instrumental Solo section, 1st prize in the Pop Jazz Instrumental Group section and consolation prize in the Song Writing Section.
 2000 – Awarded scholarship by Malaysia Authors' Copyright Protection (MACP).
 1997 – Chosen to perform in a master class conducted by Jean Harvey – chief examiner of the Associated Board of the Royal Schools of Music, London.
 1997 – One of the six most gifted young Malaysian pianists chosen to perform together with five international young pianists in the International Young Pianists' Concert.
 1993–1995 – Her talents also took her to Europe where she participated in International Piano Competitions in Ústí nad Labem in the Czech Republic in 1993, 1994 and 1995. In November 1995, she bagged the prestigious Mayor of the Town award at Ústí nad Labem. Victory topped off with a number of performances in Budapest and Copenhagen in 1994 and 1995 where Kam carved a name for herself winning the hearts of the numerous work renowned musical dilettantes in those nations.
 1992 – She also directed her talents into compositions and has since of late composed several pieces; her latest being the "Ballade – Homage a F. Chopin" which is fast gaining kudos from a number of musical connoisseurs hitherto.* This piece was the one that brought Kam to the Mayor of the Town award in Ústí nad Labem, Czech Republic.
 1991 – Bestowed the Award by the Minister of Unity and Social Development, YB Dato' Napsiah Omar Suleiman in recognition of her musical talent and consequently as a child prodigy.

Personal life
Genervie Kam tied the knot with singer, Hazama Azmi on 15 January 2017. She was previously a Christian before embracing Islam in mid-2016.

References

External links
 www.facebook.com/GenervieKam | Official Fan Page
 www.youtube.com/GenervieKam | Official Video Page

Malaysian musicians
1980 births
Living people
Malaysian people of Chinese descent
People from Selangor